Nalapara is a locality of Guwahati, situated in southern part of city.

Transport
It is connected to rest of the city with city buses and other modes of transportation.

See also
 Patharquerry
 Odalbakra

References

Neighbourhoods in Guwahati